Thymaria is a village in Greece, approximately 23 km south of Soufli. It is part of the municipal unit Tychero. It has a population of 361 (1991 census).

History 

The village of Thymaria was established in 1921 by Greek refugees from a village on the Turkish side of the river Evros named Çiftlikköy.

Sources 
 Thracian electronic treasure(Greek)

Populated places in Evros (regional unit)